Holy Cross Church (French - Collégiale Sainte-Croix) is a church in Liège, Belgium, located on place Verte in the corner of rue Sainte-Croix and rue Haute-Sauvenière. It was founded between 976 and 986 by bishop Notger and held the original St Hubert's Key, previously in the treasury of St Peter's Church. Previously a collegiate church, its chapter of secular canons was suppressed in 1797 following the Liège Revolution. The church itself was handed back for use as a worship space in 1802.

Sources
http://www.fabrice-muller.be/sc/sc1.html

Sainte-Croix
Former collegiate churches in Belgium